Battle of Gembloux may refer to:
 Battle of Gembloux (1578)
 Battle of Gembloux (1940)